Cityplace (formerly Eaton Place) is a nine-storey office and retail complex situated in Downtown Winnipeg, Manitoba, Canada. The number of weekly shoppers is 150,000.

It consists mainly of the former Eaton's company Catalogue & Mail Order building that occupies the block bounded by Hargrave and Donald Streets, and Graham and St. Mary Avenues. The warehouse was designed by John Woodman, a Winnipeg architect, and constructed in 1916.

The north side entrance is accessible from the Graham Avenue Transit Mall. Several bus routes serve nearby stops.

History 
In January 1976, Eaton's announced that they would discontinue printing their coloured catalogues in Winnipeg and would close down the catalogue and mail order building as of March 1st. All unclaimed stock at the Catalogue Office would be sold at discount. This sale went on into the summer of 1976.

Remodelling construction began in November 1977, with the Clearance Salesroom demolished to make way for the spiral parkade.

Eaton Place opened on 11 October 1979 as downtown Winnipeg's first indoor shopping mall. It capitalized on its location adjacent to the downtown Eaton's department store, which was then the largest and busiest store in the city, now demolished. The former Eaton's store site is now the city's arena, Canada Life Centre (formerly Bell MTS Place or MTS Centre).

Cineplex announced in June 1980 that they would build several multiplex movie theatres across Canada, and that Winnipeg would soon have 7 theatre locations, yet to be determined. In December 1980, the city's first multiplex movie theatre, Cineplex 7, opened on the second floor of Eaton Place. It was subsequently closed in the 1990s because of the small size of each theatre.

Following the opening of Portage Place  in the late 1980s, the owners of Eaton Place updated the interior design to compete with the other malls that had been refurbished.

In 1998, Eaton Place was purchased for $35 million by Osmington Inc., a privately-owned, Toronto-based real estate company. Israeli investors purchased the building in 2003 for an undisclosed sum. The building was then purchased by Huntingdon Real Estate Investment Trust (REIT) in 2005 for $75 million.

In 2009, the building was purchased by Manitoba Public Insurance (MPI) for $81.5 million from Huntingdon REIT. At the time of the purchase, MPI occupied approximately 80% of the office space in the building and had been leasing space there since 1980. MPI's expectation was to save $3 to $5 million annually by owning instead of renting, as well as a 10% annual return on the property investment, even after the costs of retaining the realty group for property management.

In 2010, construction completed in linking Cityplace to the adjacent Delta Hotel and Convention Centre through the Winnipeg Walkway System. The  connection cost $6.2-million, with $4.5 million in funding coming from the Winnipeg Partnership Agreement and a combined $1.7 million from Cityplace, the Delta Winnipeg, and LaSalle Investment Management. In 2012, the mall opened a rooftop terrace, accessible from the food court on the second level.

Since late 2019, there have been numerous rumours that the Manitoba government, under Premier Brian Pallister, would seek to sell of the mall to private investors. Opposition critics in the Legislature have said that this would be a negative thing because MPI would not own its offices at that location any longer.

The Manitoba Liquor Mart closed its store in the mall in January 2020 and moved it to the second floor of True North Square across the street.

Since June 2020, McCor Management is the current property management firm of Cityplace.

Amenities 
The  main complex includes two levels of retail and food court space totalling , as well as seven levels of office space. Cityplace also operates several surface parking lots and parkades. The mall also has a rooftop terrace, accessible from the food court on the second level. Cityplace is connected by elevated skywalks to the Winnipeg Walkway System, acting as a hub connecting the Portage and Graham segments, with a link connecting the RBC Convention Centre segment.

Some of the amenities at cityplace mall include:

 Food court, which includes a McDonald's, Sushi June, Za Pizza Bistro Express, Subway, Tim Hortons, Peg City Poutine  
 Eaton Place Medical Centre (a walk-in clinic)
 CIBC bank branch
 Rexall Pharmacy
 Shark Club Casino
 Boston Pizza
 Human Bean Coffee & Tea
 A&W
 Bodegoes
During the fall and winter months, Cityplace hosts the Downtown Farmers' Market, where people can purchase cheese, jams, crafts, meat.

References

External links

Buildings and structures in downtown Winnipeg
Shopping malls in Manitoba
Shopping malls established in 1979
Eaton's